The 2015 BC Lions season was the 58th season for the team in the Canadian Football League and their 62nd overall. The Lions qualified for the playoffs for the 19th straight year, but lost the West Semi-Final game to the Calgary Stampeders. This was the team's first and only season under new head coach, Jeff Tedford, former head coach at California, and the 13th under general manager Wally Buono. 

For the sixth consecutive season, the Lions held their training camp at Hillside Stadium in Kamloops, British Columbia, with rookie camp beginning Wednesday, May 27, and main camp beginning on Sunday, May 31. Due to scheduling conflicts with the 2015 FIFA Women's World Cup, the Lions' home pre-season game was played at Thunderbird Stadium on the main campus of the University of British Columbia.

Offseason

Free agents

CFL draft
The 2015 CFL Draft took place on May 12, 2015. The Lions had eight selections in the seven-round draft, gaining another fifth-round pick following the trade of Seydou Junior Haidara to Hamilton.

Preseason

 Games played with colour uniforms.

Regular season

Standings

Schedule

 Games played with colour uniforms.
 Games played with white uniforms.

Post-season

Schedule

 Games played with white uniforms.

Team

Roster

Coaching staff

References

BC Lions seasons
2015 Canadian Football League season by team
2015 in British Columbia